Harry Edward "Green River" Buckner (October 22, 1876 – March 26, 1938), also nicknamed "Buck" and "Goat Head", was an American Negro league pitcher and outfielder in the between 1896 and 1918.

Biography
A native of Hopkinsville, Kentucky, Buckner was playing with the Chicago Unions in 1896 at the age of 23. He moved on to the Chicago Columbia Giants for a couple seasons, then the Philadelphia Giants in 1903.

In 1904, Buckner joined the Cuban X-Giants, and found himself playing in Cuba during the winter seasons for about four seasons. He played for several teams in his 1930s and 1940s, including the Brooklyn Royal Giants, Lincoln Giants, and Paterson Smart Set.

Sportswriter Harry Daniels named Buckner to his 1909 "All American Team." Buckner died in 1938 at age 65.

References

External links

Negro League Baseball Museum

1876 births
1938 deaths
Club Fé players
Almendares (baseball) players
Lincoln Giants players
Louisville White Sox (1914-1915) players
Brooklyn Royal Giants players
Philadelphia Giants players
Schenectady Mohawk Giants players
Sportspeople from Hopkinsville, Kentucky
Baseball players from Kentucky
American expatriate baseball players in Cuba
Baseball pitchers